The Loughborough Gap is a  missing section of the Great Central Railway to the north-east of Loughborough, England.  The gap was created by the removal of embankments and bridges during the 1980s and the restoration project has been branded Bridge to the Future and Bridging the Gap.  From south-to-north the route crosses the Grand Union Canal, Railway Terrace road, a Factory car park, four-track Midland Main Line at Loughborough railway station and the A60 road.  The Hermitage Brook watercourse runs parallel.

, planning permission was granted for the first major component: a replacement 30-metre single-span bridge over the Midland Main Line. An additional station called Loughborough High Level will be built to connect with Loughborough (Midland) station on the Midland Main Line. , the bridge was intended to be owned by Charnwood Borough Council and then leased back to the Great Central Railway for one hundred years in exchange for maintenance costs. Work commenced in April 2017, with the main bridge beams being installed in September of that year. The bridge is expected to be completed in 2019. 

The replacement bridge was completed ahead of schedule in August 2018. However due to slight encroachment on the original trackbed, the bridge is slightly askew from the original alignment. Refurbishment has also been conducted on the canal bridge just beyond the existing train shed. Future work will see the embankment reinstated and the current train shed demolished and replaced by one close by as the shed occupies the main line alignment. In addition signalling will need be connected and updated to match the other preserved line.

History

As a relatively late-developed railway in the United Kingdom, the GCR was forced to make some expensive civil engineering choices in order to complete their route.

Choosing to approach the location on a raised embankment, the railway engineers used a steel-decked span bridge to cross the canal and a double-deck, double-width steel-decked span bridge to cross the Midland Railway.

After the decision was made to close the GCR as part of the Beeching Axe, in the late 1960s contractors were appointed to remove the railway tracks and major parts of the civil engineering infrastructure. Contractors initially removed the railway tracks, before also removing the bridges and supporting buttresses over the Midland Main Line, and then the embankment to its south. Unfortunately, the following year the Hermitage Brook flooded, resulting in additional contractors being engaged to reimplement part of the railway's former embankment.

After the formation of the Great Central as a heritage railway, bridging the resultant "gap" always became a significant challenge to realise the full operational vision. Since the closure of the line, Morley Street industrial estate had been developed on part of the site formerly occupied by the embankment, whilst Loughborough Borough Council had developed, filled with household waste and then covered a landfill to the south.

Current features
It is bounded: to the west by the northeasternmost part of Loughborough, including the Loughborough Midland station and Morley Street industrial estate; to the east by the covered former household refuse site; and to the north and south by GCR's northern and southern sections respectively.

Current plans for bridging the gap, using a single-track line, include:
 Removing the Loughborough north shed. This will be a long-term project, as the approach from the canal bridge to Loughborough North signal box will initially be a single track running alongside the existing shed.  This has been 3D modelled to prove feasibility.
 The Loughborough Top Shed project would then rebuild the recovered remnants of the former LNWR Workington, Cumbria steam shed on an old landfill site, just to the north-east of the current shed.
These were originally planned to bridge the gap over the Midland Main Line, but are now planned to be deployed elsewhere in the project. This part is called the "Factory Flyover".
 Add a 300 metre embankment between the canal bridge and the factory flyover.
 Fix the A60 bridge and the embankment between the A60 bridge and the midland main line bridge. 

Once complete, the project will create a combined  heritage railway.

Implementation
After the UK Government's announcement in 2012 that the Midland Main Line would be electrified by 2018, the project timescales to be completed or not were implemented. In 2013, the GCR engaged Network Rail to act as project engineers, project manager and main contractor to complete the project. In June 2013, the GCR and Network Rail signed an agreement to allow bridging of the Midland Main Line, including the underlying operations, maintenance and legal liability agreements for such.

Preliminary works began January 2014 with boreholes being drilled in preparation for the bridge over the Midland Main Line at Loughborough.

In July 2014, the GCR received a one million pound grant from the UK Government's "Local Growth Deal", via an allocation to the Leicester and Leicestershire Local Enterprise Partnership; the grant will support the GCR's "Bridging the Gap" project.

Planning application
On 15 April 2014 a planning application was submitted by Great Central Railway PLC with Network Rail acting as agents for "Installation of rail bridge over midland mainline"; which was granted on 27 June 2014.  The bridge was envisioned as being single-track and made of two spans and a central supporting pillar in the middle.   On 10 February 2015 a non-material minor amendment was applied for in order to allow construction using a single-span bridge design "to remove [the] central pillar"; which was granted by Charnwood Borough Council on 26 March 2015.  A two-span design had originally been proposed in order to enable reuse of bridge components removed during the rebuilding of Reading station.

Contracts and legals
Although the GCR owns the track from Loughborough to Leicester North, the underlying land is owned by Charnwood Borough Council, on a 99-year lease signed in 1976. Bridges over or under Network Rail infrastructure must be owned by organisations which can provide suitable legal liability to any incidents which may occur as a result of operations, which means to meet this requirement the owning organisation needs to have a minimum Net present value of over £250M. As the GCR can not clearly meet this criteria, after contract negotiations, it was agreed that Charnwood Borough Council will retain ownership of the land up to the southern abutment of the new bridge, whilst Network Rail will become the owner of the new bridge. The GCR will resultantly negotiate an operational lease agreement with Network Rail, which will define operational requirements which the GCR must comply with over the bridge.

Midland Main Line bridge

Preparatory work on the bridge over the Midland Main Line began on 12 February 2016 while the main construction work commenced in April 2017, with the main bridge beams being installed in September 2017. In the early hours of 3 September 2017 a 1000-tonne crane was used to lift the two steel beams forming the basis of the bridge into place.

The bridge was expected to be completed in 2019.  As of late 2017, £2.5m had been spent installing the bridge over the Midland Main Line.

Canal bridge
In 2014 a detailed assessment of work on the double track bridge over the Grand Union canal had been undertaken.  The bridge had last carried trains in 1969.  three separate quotes for renovating the bridge had been obtained, refurbishment is expected to cost about £400,000.
Bridge refurbishment completed July 2020.

References

External links

Project website (archived version - original now offline)
 Great Central Railway - Bridge to the Future.
 Nottingham Transport Heritage Centre.

Great Central Railway
Great Central Railway (preserved)
Gap